The savanna path shrew (Crocidura viaria) is a species of mammal in the family Soricidae. It is found in Benin, Burkina Faso, Cameroon, Chad, Eritrea, Ethiopia, Ghana, Kenya, Mali, Mauritania, Morocco, Niger, Nigeria, Senegal, Somalia, Sudan, and Uganda. Its natural habitats are subtropical or tropical moist lowland forest, dry savanna, and heavily degraded former forest.

References
 Hutterer, R. 2004.  Crocidura viaria.   2006 IUCN Red List of Threatened Species.   Downloaded on 30 July 2007.

Crocidura
Mammals described in 1834
Taxonomy articles created by Polbot